SPE "Aerosila" is the leading Russian firm in the field of development and manufacturing of aircraft propellers, propfans, auxiliary gas-turbine engines as well as aviation aggregates of different purpose including hydromechanical rotation frequency governors of propellers and power ballscrew mechanisms with integrated gearboxes for aircraft with a wing variable sweep, oil-pumps, air regulators, fans and others.

Since 1956 the enterprise started creation of auxiliary gas-turbine engines for APU. For a short period the enterprise has developed and put into operation the family of TA for the aircraft Tu-154, Tu-154M, Tu-134A, Tu-144, Tu-160, Tu-22M, Tu-204, Il-62, Il-62M, Il-76, Il-76MD, Yak-42, An-22, An-124, An-74, An-70, A-40, and the helicopter Mi-26. Currently, the company is working on developing new APU for future aircraft Irkut MC-21 and Beriev A-100

References

External links
Aerosila

Aircraft propeller manufacturers
Companies based in Moscow Oblast
Aircraft engine manufacturers of the Soviet Union
Aircraft component manufacturers of the Soviet Union